Manduca duquefi is a moth of the  family Sphingidae. It is known from French Guiana.

References

Manduca
Moths described in 2007